Sardar Shahar railway station is a railway station in Churu district, Rajasthan. Its code is SRDR. It serves Sardar Shahar town. The station consists of a single platform. DEMU trains start from here for Ratangarh.

References

Railway stations in Churu district
Bikaner railway division